"The Empire-Builder from Calisota" or "The Richest Duck in the World" is a 1994 Scrooge McDuck comic by Don Rosa. It is the eleventh of the original 12 chapters in the series The Life and Times of Scrooge McDuck. The story takes place from 1909 to 1930 and details Scrooge finishing his quest to become the richest man in the world, during which he becomes hardened and overall hostile towards others.

The story was first published in the Danish Anders And & Co. #1994-15; the first American publication was in Uncle Scrooge #295, in December 1995.

Plot
When Scrooge visits his Money Bin to see his progress on becoming the richest man in the world, Matilda and Hortense, tired of being left to watch the office while he goes globe-trotting, demand that he either stay in Duckburg to run his business empire, or let them accompany him on his next trip. He reacts to his new secretary Emily Quackfaster with shock and allows Hortense's fiancé Quackmore Duck the position as office manager only on the pretense that "his greedy hope for an inheritance will keep him honest". 

Hearing of prime land for diamond mining in Africa, Scrooge takes his sisters with him there and down the Mumbo Jumbo River, where he purchases mining lands from a local tribe for a mere quarter-dollar. This shocks his sisters, to which he responds by dismissing how honest he was in the past due to how long it took for him to get rich, saying that he has "decided to develop new methods".

Scrooge goes to purchase more valuable land for rubber tree plantations from a voodoo tribe, but their chief, Foola Zoola, refuses to sell, angering Scrooge and getting him kicked out in front of his sisters. Humiliated, Scrooge returns with hired mercenaries to burn down the village and tricks Foola Zoola into signing the deed giving him their land, committing the one dishonest deed in his life. He returns to his campsite, only to find that his sisters have returned to Duckburg. Scrooge tries to justify himself with his hardships, but then he hears his deceased father Fergus talking to him about self-respect. Scrooge is ridden with guilt and hopes to make amends, but bumps into a zombie named Bombie, sent by Foola Zoola as his revenge. However, Scrooge is able to escape when Bombie is confused by his real appearance.

Scrooge goes to a railroad to follow his sisters home, but the next train back home won't leave for another week. He takes a cheaper ride by boat to Europe, where he spends a year increasing his profits. At the polar ice cap, he tries to finance Robert Peary's expedition so he can buy the North Pole, but is turned down. He then comes across Bombie again, and during another attempt to fool him with his appearance, Bombie falls into a crevice and gets sealed in ice. Later, Scrooge receives a telegram from Saint Petersburg inviting him to the palace of Czar Nicholas II of Russia, where he buys Fabergé eggs in bulk; Nicholas points Scrooge to the Candy-Striped Ruby that inspired the eggs, and Scrooge retrieves it from bandits in the Asian steppes.

As the Titanic sinks, so does Bombie, and Scrooge escapes on a boat, during which he realizes that a lot of cargo and treasure had gone down with the ship. Seeking opportunity, he delays his return home again to search the Titanic for treasure and continue his worldwide expedition. He begins to use a train to ship his collected money home. In Baghdad, he is attacked by bandits and shoved off a cliff, but lands inside one of the train's loads of money, and he develops his famous "money swim". He also tries this with a load of coal, only to wind up with a smashed noggin.

Years later, in the South Pacific, Scrooge makes an offer with a village chief for their coconuts, during which he comes across Bombie once again. He pays the chief his Candy-Striped Ruby in exchange for having the witch doctor cast a spell that will bind Bombie to their island for at least 30 years, freeing Scrooge to continue his global journey.

After 27 years of buying properties and increasing his profits, Scrooge finally returns home to a newly-grown Duckburg, now a cold, hard man. He rejects the key to the city (smashing it over the mayor's head) and blows off a large group of beggars in front of the Money Bin. He comes home to a welcoming gathering from his family, including Hortense and Quackmore's children Della and Donald. However, he ignores them too and orders Quackfaster to install booby traps outside for the beggars and give him an audit of the money in the Bin. Hortense yells at Scrooge for blowing them off, but he refuses to listen. Sickened by this, his family leaves, and Donald kicks him in the tailfeathers. After remembering his childhood, Scrooge is overwhelmed and goes to apologize, but he then finds out from a letter that he has passed the Maharajah of Howduyustan and finally achieved his life's goal: he is now the richest person in the world. The comic ends with Scrooge letting out a loud cackle in triumph as Matilda laments that now he only has "money and all that money can buy".

External links

The Empire-Builder from Calisota on Duckman
The Life and Times of $crooge McDuck - Episode 11

Disney comics stories
Donald Duck comics by Don Rosa
Fiction set in 1909
Fiction set in the 1910s
Fiction set in the 1920s
Fiction set in 1930
1994 in comics
Comics set in the 1900s
Comics set in the 1910s
Comics set in the 1920s
Comics set in the 1930s
Comics set in Africa
Comics set in Iraq
Comics set in the Pacific Ocean
Comics set in Russia
Comics set in the United States
Zombies in comics
The Life and Times of Scrooge McDuck

simple:The Empire-Builder from Calisota